Albert Lawrence Williams Jr., known as A. L. Williams, (born March 11, 1934) is a former American football coach and college athletic administrator. He served as the head football coach  at Northwestern State University from 1975 to 1982 and Louisiana Tech University from 1983 to 1986, compiling career college football coaching record of 66–65–1. Williams was also the athletic director at Northwestern State from 1978 to 1983.

Williams began his coaching career at the high school level, at Fair Park High School and Woodlawn High School in Shreveport, Louisiana. Williams led Woodlawn to a record of 64–25, winning four district titles and the 1968 state championship. with Joe Ferguson at quarterback. Williams also coached Terry Bradshaw at Woodlawn.

Head coaching record

College

References

1934 births
Living people
Fair Park High School alumni
Louisiana Tech Bulldogs football coaches
Louisiana Tech Bulldogs football players
Northwestern State Demons and Lady Demons athletic directors
Northwestern State Demons football coaches
High school football coaches in Louisiana
People from Haynesville, Louisiana
Sportspeople from Natchitoches, Louisiana
Sportspeople from Ruston, Louisiana
Louisiana Republicans
Players of American football from Shreveport, Louisiana